The Grapes is a Grade II listed public house at 439 Liverpool Rd, Peel Green, Eccles, Salford M30 7HD.

It is on the Campaign for Real Ale's National Inventory of Historic Pub Interiors.

It was built in 1903 by Mr. Newton of the architects Hartley, Hacking & Co. A separate pub called the Grapes is on Church Street.

References

 Grade II listed pubs in Greater Manchester
 National Inventory Pubs
 Grade II listed buildings in the City of Salford
 Eccles, Greater Manchester